Hazorasp District (Ҳазорасп тумани) is a district of Xorazm Region in Uzbekistan. The capital lies at the town Hazorasp. In 2020 it lost the larger eastern part of its territory to the new Tuproqqalʼa District. The district consists of 4 urban-type settlements (Hazorasp, Oq yop, Oyok ovvo, Nurxayot) and 11 rural communities.

References

Xorazm Region
Districts of Uzbekistan